Phlox hoodii, the spiny phlox or carpet phlox, is a species of phlox. It is a plant of western North America, where it is a common flower in sagebrush country, mostly growing in dry lithosol habitats. It is among the first plants to bloom in spring, after the snow has melted. Its distribution extends from Alaska to Arizona. There are many subspecies.

This perennial herb is variable in morphology, but usually forms a tight mat or loose clump on the ground. The herbage is hairy in texture, the hairs short to long, woolly to cobwebby. The appearance of the plant is almost mosslike until blooming. The inflorescence is a solitary flower in shades of white, pink, or blue.

References

External links

Calflora Database: Phlox hoodii (Spiny phlox)
Jepson Manual eFlora (TJM2) treatment of Phlox hoodii ssp canescens
UC CalPhotos gallery

hoodii
Flora of the Northwestern United States
Flora of the North-Central United States
Flora of the Southwestern United States
Flora of Western Canada
Flora of the Great Basin
Flora of the Sierra Nevada (United States)
Flora of Subarctic America
Flora without expected TNC conservation status